The Pacific Swift is a square topsail schooner, built by S.A.L.T.S. as a working exhibit at Expo '86 in Vancouver, British Columbia.  She provides 5- to 10-day sail training programs for young people and day sails for S.A.L.T.S. members around Vancouver Island and along the coast of British Columbia.

The Pacific Swift has completed four offshore voyages, some of more than a year in duration. Her offshore travels have taken her to Australia and Europe, to remote communities on Easter and Pitcairn Island, and to many other far-flung ports of call.

The Pacific Swift has a sparred length of 34 m, total sail area of 510 sq m and weighs 71.45 gross tons. The Swift is a traditional tall ship which requires manpower to sail.

See also
 List of schooners

References

External links

 A full list of the Pacific Swift trips can be found on the S.A.L.T.S. website
 The Bosun's Mate Dedicated to global nautical history and SALTS shipmates
 Virtual tour of the Pacific Swift

1986 ships
Expo 86
Individual sailing vessels
Sail training ships
Schooners
Ships built in British Columbia
Tall ships of Canada